The 2010 World Pool Masters, also known as World Pool Masters XVIII, was a nine-ball pool tournament that took place in The Riviera, Las Vegas, United States,
between 12–16 May 2010. It was the 18th edition of the invitational tournament organised by Matchroom Sport.

Dennis Orcollo won the event, defeating Toru Kuribayashi in the final 8–3. The previous year's winner, Darren Appleton lost in the last 32 stage to Oliver Ortmann.

Event prize money

Tournament bracket 
The field was made up of 64 players, with a double elimination round before reaching the last 32, where a single elimination tournament began.

References

External links

2010
World Pool Masters
World Pool Masters
World Pool Masters
Sports competitions in the Las Vegas Valley